Georges Eo (born 7 November 1948 in Lorient) is a French football manager and former midfielder. He was assistant manager of Nantes from 1987 to 2005, during which time the club won two Ligue 1 titles. He became the club's full manager in 2006, but was replaced during the middle of the 2006–07 season by his assistant Michel Der Zakarian; they were relegated to the Ligue 2 at the end of the season.

External links
 Biography
 Career stats

Living people
1948 births
Sportspeople from Lorient
French footballers
France under-21 international footballers
Association football midfielders
Ligue 1 players
FC Lorient players
FC Nantes players
Paris FC players
Olympique de Marseille players
Red Star F.C. players
French football managers
Red Star F.C. managers
FC Nantes managers
Footballers from Brittany